Mark Anthony Hodgkiss (born 10 January 1977) is a former English cricketer.  Hodgkiss was a right-handed batsman.  He was born in West Bromwich, West Midlands.

Hodgkiss represented the Worcestershire Cricket Board in 2 List A matches against Staffordshire and Cumberland in the 2001 Cheltenham & Gloucester Trophy.  In his 2 List A matches, he batted once, scoring 48*.  With the ball he took 3 wickets at a bowling average of 9.33, with best figures of 3/16.

References

External links
Mark Hodgkiss at Cricinfo
Mark Hodgkiss at CricketArchive

1977 births
Living people
Sportspeople from West Bromwich
English cricketers
Worcestershire Cricket Board cricketers